The Legacy may refer to:
 Le Legs or The Legacy, a play by Pierre de Marivaux
 The Legacy (professional wrestling), a former professional wrestling faction in World Wrestling Entertainment
 The Legacy (album), an album by Testament
 "The Legacy" (song), a 2011 song by Black Veil Brides
 The Legacy (1978 film), a horror film directed by Richard Marquand
 The Legacy (2009 film), a drama film from Canada directed by Bernard Émond
 The Legacy (TV series), a 2014 Danish television drama
 The Legacy (Lindenwood University), a college newspaper
 The Legacy (1961–2002), a boxset covering four decades of recordings by Glen Campbell
 The Legacy: Realm of Terror, a 1993 computer game
 The Legacy (Forgotten Realms novel), a 1992 book by R. A. Salvatore
 The Legacy (Shute novel) (A Town Like Alice), a 1950 novel by Neville Shute
 The Legacy, a 2010 novel by Kirsten Tranter, nominated for the Miles Franklin Award
 "The Legacy", a song by Testament on Souls of Black
 "The Legacy", a song by Iron Maiden on A Matter of Life and Death
 "The Legacy", a single by Push
 "The Legacy", a secret society of paranormal investigators on the TV show Poltergeist: The Legacy

See also 
 Legacy (disambiguation)